Acoma sexfoliata is a species of beetles first discovered by Saylor in 1948. No sub-species are listed at Catalogue of Life.

References

Melolonthinae